Ixodes hoogstraali is a species of tick endemic to the higher mountains of southwestern Arabia. The type specimens were collected at  elevation near Ma'bar, Yemen, on king jirds (Meriones rex buryi Thomas), trapped beside a well in dry fields on a rocky plateau. The species was named in honor of Harry Hoogstraal, who provided the type specimens; the species is closely related to Ixodes ugandanus Neumann, 1906.

References

hoogstraali
Animals described in 1955
Endemic fauna of Saudi Arabia